The Organisationsforum Wirtschaftskongress (OFW) is a student-run, non-profit initiative that affords "high-performance students" the opportunity to turn their theoretical business knowledge into entrepreneurial actions. For this purpose, the members organise the annual World Business Dialogue, which unites 400 international students with companies and young leaders as well as top-class speakers.

The headquarter of the company is located in Cologne, Germany.

External links 
 OFW
 OFW Student Consulting and Research GmbH (OSCAR GmbH)

Youth organisations based in Germany
Business organisations based in Germany